This is a listing in alphabetical order of the 309 municipalities in Finland as of 2021. Note that there are 114 municipalities that have both a Finnish and a Swedish name. Those municipalities are listed by the name in the local majority language, with the name in the other national language provided in parenthesis. Finnish is the majority language in 99 of those 114 municipalities, while Swedish is the majority language in 15 of them. The four municipalities that are wholly or partly within the Sami native region have their names given also in the local Sami languages (Inari Sami, Skolt Sami and Northern Sami in the case of Inari; only Northern Sami in the other cases).

References

External links 

 
Finland
Municipalities